This is a season-by-season list of records compiled by Wisconsin in men's ice hockey.

The University of Wisconsin–Madison has won six NCAA Championship in its history, the most recent coming in 2006 (as of 2019).

Season-by-season results

Note: GP = Games played, W = Wins, L = Losses, T = Ties

† Wisconsin's participation in the 1992 NCAA Tournament was later vacated due to NCAA rules violations.

Footnotes

References

 
Wisconsin
Wisconsin Badgers ice hockey seasons